Europium(II) iodide is the iodide salt of divalent europium cation.

Preparation
Europium(II) iodide can be prepared in a handful of ways, including:

Reduction of europium(III) iodide with hydrogen gas at 350 °C:

Thermal decomposition of europium(III) iodide at 200 °C:

Reaction of europium with mercury(II) iodide:

Reaction of europium with ammonium iodide:

Structure
Europium(II) iodide has several polymorphs. It adopts a monoclinic crystal structure in space group P 21/c (no. 14).

It also adopts an ortho­rhombic polymorph in space group Pbca (no. 61). This form is isostructural with strontium iodide.

A third polymorph of europium(II) iodide is formed if it is prepared from europium and ammonium iodide at low temperatures (200 K) in liquid ammonia. This low-temperature phase is ortho­rhombic and in space group Pnma (no. 62). This is the same structure as modification IV of strontium iodide.

References

Europium(II) compounds
Iodides
Lanthanide halides